Johannes Gutenberg (c. 1400–1468) was a German printer who invented effective mechanical printing.

Gutenberg may also refer to:

People
Gutenberg (surname)

Places
 Gutenberg (crater), a crater on the Moon
 Gutenberg, Germany, a municipality in Rhineland-Palatinate, Germany
 Gutenberg an der Raabklamm, a municipality in Styria, Austria
 Gutenberg Castle, a castle in Liechtenstein
 Gutenburg Castle, a ruined castle in Gutenberg, Rhineland-Palatinate, Germany

Education
 Gutenberg College, a four-year college in Eugene, Oregon
 Gutenberg Museum, Mainz, Germany
 Project Gutenberg, a volunteer effort to digitize, archive, and distribute cultural works

Other uses
Gutenberg, a 1993 children's book by author and illustrator Leonard Everett Fisher
 Gutenberg Bible, printed by Johannes Gutenberg circa 1455
 Gutenberg! The Musical!, off-Broadway musical running in New York City
 The Gutenberg discontinuity, a seismic propagation discontinuity at the core–mantle boundary
 Gutenberg, the default editor of WordPress as of version 5.0 (2018)

See also
 Guttenburg, a German brig wrecked on the Goodwin Sands on 1 January 1860
 Gutenburg (disambiguation)
 Guttenberg (disambiguation)
 Project Gutenberg (disambiguation)